Richard Langley Burchnall (born 23 August 1948) is a former English first-class cricketer and educator.

The son of Michael Langley and Pamela Margaret (Harris) Burchnall, he was born in Oxford in August 1948. His father was employed at Winchester College as head of the English department and housemaster, with Burchnall gaining a scholarship to attend the college. From Winchester he spent a year in Africa teaching English, before returning to England to study at Lincoln College, Oxford. While studying at Oxford, Burchnall played first-class cricket for Oxford University, making his debut against Somerset in 1968. He played first-class cricket for Oxford until 1971, making 32 appearances and gaining his blue. Playing as a batsman, he scored a total of 874 runs at an average of 15.89 and a high score of 85, one of four half centuries he made. 

He met his future wife while at Oxford, Jane Truscott, from South Australia. After completing their studies, the couple emigrated to Australia in January 1972, with Burchnall appointed to the post of Latin teacher at Melbourne Grammar School shortly after his arrival. He completed his graduate studies at the University of Melbourne, before returning to England where he taught for two years at Wellington College. Returning to Australia, he rose to become the head of classics at Melbourne Grammar School. He was appointed headmaster of St Peter's College, Adelaide in 1992, a position he retained until his retirement in 2004. Burchnall later served as the chairman of St Mark's College at the University of Adelaide, though he resigned from the role in June 2018, following accusations of hazing, bullying and sexual assault at the college.

References

External links

1948 births
Living people
People from Oxford
People educated at Winchester College
Alumni of Lincoln College, Oxford
English cricketers
Oxford University cricketers
Schoolteachers from Oxfordshire
English emigrants to Australia
University of Melbourne alumni
Australian headmasters